(2Z,6Z)-farnesyl diphosphate synthase (cis,cis-farnesyl diphosphate synthase, Z,Z-FPP synthase, zFPS, Z,Z-farnesyl pyrophosphate synthase) is an enzyme with systematic name dimethylallyl-diphosphate:isopentenyl-diphosphate cistransferase (adding 2 isopentenyl units). This enzyme catalyses the following chemical reaction

 dimethylallyl diphosphate + 2 isopentenyl diphosphate  2 diphosphate + (2Z,6Z)-farnesyl diphosphate

This enzyme was originally characterized from the wild hairy tomato Solanum habrochaites.

References

External links 
 

EC 2.5.1